Hearne Academy, founded in 1881, was a school for African Americans during the post-Reconstruction era in Hearne, Texas. It was renamed and relocated in 1909 to become Fort Worth Industrial and Mechanical College in Fort Worth, Texas. It was modeled after Tuskegee Institute. That institution closed in 1929 after struggling financially.

The school was supported by Baptist organizations. It offered elementary through secondary, college preparatory, and industrial classes.

Major J. Johnson was its president in 1916. Elizabeth Stumm, a teacher and writer who was married to a missionary priest, taught at the school. She was African American.

Alumni
Alexander Asberry, state legislator
Robert J. Moore, state legislator

References

1881 establishments in Texas
1929 disestablishments in Texas
Preparatory schools in Texas
Middle schools in Texas
High schools in Texas